Alan K. Parrish is a professor of religious education at Brigham Young University (BYU) who has written books and articles related to American education and the Church of Jesus Christ of Latter-day Saints (LDS Church), most notably a biography of John A. Widtsoe.

Parrish was born and raised in Logan, Utah.  He served in the Southwest British Mission of the LDS Church, based in Bristol, England.   After his mission he received a bachelor's degree and an MBA from Utah State University.  After being in business for a short time he was recruited to work for the Church Educational System beginning as a seminary teacher. He then taught institute adjacent to UCLA and served as bishop of the UCLA ward, while at the same time receiving an Ed.D. degree from the University of Southern California.

From 1978 to 1984 Parrish was the director of the LDS Institute of Religion in Cambridge, Massachusetts.  In 1984 he joined the faculty of BYU.

Sources
Dust Jacket bio attached to Biography of John A. Widtsoe
BYU bio 

Latter Day Saints from California
American biographers
American Mormon missionaries in England
Brigham Young University faculty
Church Educational System instructors
Writers from Logan, Utah
USC Rossier School of Education alumni
Utah State University alumni
20th-century Mormon missionaries
Living people
Latter Day Saints from Massachusetts
Latter Day Saints from Utah
Year of birth missing (living people)